Samaila may refer to:
 Samaila, village in Kraljevo municipality, Serbia
 Sămăila, village in Priboieni municipality, Argeș County, Romania